Donacia andalusiaca is a species of leaf beetle of the subfamily Donaciinae that is endemic to Spain.

References

Beetles described in 1869
Endemic fauna of Spain
Beetles of Europe
Donaciinae